Al-Hafiz Hamzah (born 15 March 1984) is a former Malaysian professional footballer who plays as a goalkeeper.

Club career

Kedah FA
He was a product of Kedah's youth system (President Cup team), and started in the junior squad during the 2002 season, but it was not until 2004 that he debuted in the senior side, replacing Megat Amir Faisal Al Khalidi Ibrahim.

In 2004, where Malaysian football was introduced with the Malaysia Super League, Al-Hafiz became a second choice goalkeeper behind Megat Amir Faisal after Mirandinha brought him into the senior squad. However, he had been given a chance and made his debut in the first league match against Selangor Public Bank FC on 14 February 2004 after Megat Amir Faisal had a serious back injury during the pre-season preparations.

USM FC
Al-Hafiz joined Premier league side, USM FC, in the 2012 season.

Johor Darul Takzim FC
Al-Hafiz joined the star-studded squad, Johor Darul Takzim F.C., in 2013, after USM FC management cited financial difficulties as the reason for the decision to pull out of the Malaysia Premier League. He got off to a mixed start for the 2013 season but managed to cement his place as a first-choice goalkeeper throughout the season.

Honours

Club honours
Johor Darul Takzim
 Malaysian Charity Shield: 2015 Winner
 Malaysia Super League (2): 2014, 2015
 2014 Malaysia Cup: Runner Up
 2013 Malaysia FA Cup: Runner Up

References

External links
 

1984 births
Living people
Malaysian footballers
People from Kedah
Kedah Darul Aman F.C. players
Johor Darul Ta'zim F.C. players
Malaysia Super League players
Association football goalkeepers
Malaysian people of Malay descent